Robert "Bob" Lilley (born May 2, 1966) is an American soccer coach who is the head coach of USL Championship club Pittsburgh Riverhounds SC. He has managed the Hershey Wildcats, Montreal Impact, Vancouver Whitecaps, Detroit Ignition, and Rochester Rhinos.

A former midfielder, he played collegiately at George Mason before appearing at the professional level for Orlando Lions and Maryland Bays and indoors with Hershey Impact, Harrisburg Heat, and Pittsburgh Stingers.

Playing career
Bob Lilley attended George Mason University and played for the George Mason Patriots from 1984 to 1987. He played in 82 games for the Patriots, which was the second-most appearances in school history  Lilley served as team captain for the Patriots.

In 1989, Lilley signed with the Orlando Lions of the American Soccer League.  In 1990, the ASL merged with the Western Soccer Alliance to form the American Professional Soccer League. Lilley spent the 1990 season with the Lions in the new APSL.  In the fall of 1990, he joined the Hershey Impact of the National Professional Soccer League.  In 1992, he moved to the Harrisburg Heat.  In 1994, he spent the summer indoor season with the Pittsburgh Stingers in the Continental Indoor Soccer League. Following the 1996–1997 NPSL season, Lilley retired from playing and entered the coaching ranks.

Management career
His first coaching experience was with the Hershey Wildcats in 1997, experiencing much success with the club as being the team's one and only head coach. He led Hershey to the playoffs each year, as well winning A-League coach of the year in his rookie season. He was able to guide Hershey to one Northern Conference and three Atlantic Division titles as well as the 2001 A-League National Championship final, which they lost 2–0 to the Rochester Raging Rhinos. After the 2001 season, the team was folded by the ownership, having decided that the team would not be successful financially.

On January 23, 2002 he was appointed the new head coach of the Montreal Impact signing on a two-year contract. His first season with the Impact, the team finished first in the Northeast Division, and also claimed the Voyageurs Cup. In 2003, he led Montreal to the Eastern Conference title and, the Voyageurs Cup for the second time in a row. And for the second time in his career he wins the A-League Coach of the Year, becoming only the second two-time Coach of the Year recipient in league history, following Alan Hinton in 1994, and 1995.

After the 2003 season he left the Impact for personal reasons, eventually signing a two-year deal with the Vancouver Whitecaps on November 1, 2004 becoming the team's first American coach, and the first coach never to have previously played for Vancouver.

He led Vancouver to the playoffs in 2004 but were eliminated in the quarterfinals, but were able to claim the Cascadia Cup. In 2006, he led the Whitecaps to their first North American championship since 1979, when they defeated the Raging Rhinos 3–0 at PAETEC Park becoming the first team in USL First Division history to win the title on the road.

Lilley was sacked as Vancouver Whitecaps head coach on September 18, 2007 two days after the Whitecaps were eliminated by the Portland Timbers in the first round of the United Soccer Leagues First Division playoffs. He was hired by the Detroit Ignition of the Major Indoor Soccer League as their assistant coach afterwards and promoted to head coach on November 6, 2007.

On November 16, 2009 the Rochester Rhinos announced the hiring of Lilley as the club's new head coach for the 2010 season.

During their match on January 25, 2013, the new Harrisburg Heat of the Professional Arena Soccer League honored Lilley with a halftime ceremony for his service with the original Heat franchise in the mid-1990s.

Jesse Myers took Lilley's coaching position with the Rochester Rhinos starting in the 2012 season. However, Lilley was rehired by the Rhinos for the 2014 season. He remained with the Rochester Rhinos through the end of the 2017 season.

As Rochester's 2018 season looked increasingly shaky following years of declining attendance, Lilley departed the club to become the head coach of the Pittsburgh Riverhounds. The Rochester Rhinos would ultimately go on hiatus for the 2018 season, and Lilley would be joined in Pittsburgh by Rhinos assistant coach Mark Pulisic as well as many of the players on the Rhinos squad.

Under Lilley's management, the Riverhounds underwent drastic improvement when compared to the prior two seasons, in which the club had finished with a losing record. The Riverhounds held a clean sheet through the first four matches, the first time the club had achieved such a streak since the United Soccer League formed in 2011. The team went undefeated for their first ten matches before finally posting their first loss on May 30, 2018. Lilley told reporters after a May 26 draw that he remained unhappy with the team's performance, as only four of those unbeaten matches were wins and the team was in 4th place on the Eastern Conference standings. However, the team would go on to win five of their next six matches after the May 30 loss before posting their next loss. As of August 12, 2018, the Riverhounds hold a 12–3–7 record, putting them in 2nd place in the Eastern Conference behind FC Cincinnati.

Managerial stats

 Note: Pittsburgh statistics are through the end of the 2021 USL Championship season.

References

External links
Whitecaps profile of Bob Lilley
United Soccer League profile of Bob Lilley

 

1966 births
Living people
American Professional Soccer League players
American soccer coaches
American soccer players
American Soccer League (1988–89) players
Continental Indoor Soccer League players
Expatriate soccer managers in Canada
Association football midfielders
George Mason Patriots men's soccer players
Harrisburg Heat players
Hershey Impact players
Maryland Bays players
National Professional Soccer League (1984–2001) players
Orlando Lions players
People from Monmouth County, New Jersey
Pittsburgh Stingers players
Montreal Impact (1992–2011) coaches
Vancouver Whitecaps (1986–2010) coaches
Pittsburgh Riverhounds SC coaches
Rochester New York FC coaches